Elemér Szathmáry (1926 – 17 December 1971) was a Hungarian swimmer and Olympic medalist, born in Budapest. He participated in the 1948 Summer Olympics in London, winning a silver medal in 4 x 200 metre freestyle relay.

References

External links

1926 births
1971 deaths
Swimmers from Budapest
Hungarian male swimmers
Olympic swimmers of Hungary
Olympic silver medalists for Hungary
Swimmers at the 1948 Summer Olympics
Hungarian male freestyle swimmers
European Aquatics Championships medalists in swimming
Medalists at the 1948 Summer Olympics
Olympic silver medalists in swimming